Exhumed is an American death metal band from San Jose, California that is currently signed to Relapse Records and centered around guitarist/vocalist Matt Harvey. The band has released eight albums and eight split 7-inch singles. They were formed in 1990, went on hiatus in 2005, and reformed in 2010.

Background

Early history (1990–2000) 
Exhumed formed in 1990, when founding member Matt Harvey was 15 years old. Exhumed spent much of the ensuing decade releasing numerous demos, split CDs, and EPs. Harvey explained that he was influenced by Carcass, Impetigo, Repulsion and Terrorizer as well as early albums by Entombed.

The band recorded their debut album Gore Metal in 1998. The album blended death metal and grindcore and influenced later bands who played the same type of music. Harvey said that Gore Metal was the album where Exhumed developed its vision, although he conceded that "we were still very loose and sloppy and didn't really have a handle on recording at all. Listening back to that record, I like most of the songs, but the production is awful sounding." Harvey said the band recorded several songs for the album that were lost when producer James Murphy, then suffering from brain cancer and acting "erratically", was evicted from his studio in Oakland.

Middle period and hiatus (2001–2009) 
This led to the band touring the United States and making several festival appearances. The band's line-up continued to change during and after the release of their second album, Slaughtercult, in August 2000. Harvey said that Slaughtercult was "the album where we came closest to achieving our goal – just a brutal, simple, direct group of songs that were very up-front and live sounding." He further noted the band's pride over the lack of double bass on the album, in contrast to contemporary death metal trends. In support of Slaughtercult, the band did three US tours, and their first proper European tour, including co-headlining festivals like Fuck the Commerce and Obscene Extreme. The band also appeared at the Wacken Open Air festival.

The band evolved further with their third album, Anatomy Is Destiny (2003), which added more sophisticated arrangements, production and instrumentation. Bassist Leon del Muerte replaced Bud Burke soon after the album was recorded. Harvey described the album as "a big step forward", but retrospectively criticized the album for its lack of memorable choruses. He said of Anatomy Is Destiny, "in many ways it's our best album, but in just as many, we missed the mark on a bunch of things."

Co-founder and drummer Col Jones departed Exhumed in 2003, which affected the creative chemistry of the band. Harvey recalled, "After he (Jones) left it was a big adjustment. I was trying to run shit on my own creatively and logistically. The anatomy of the band just dissolved and everything fell apart." As Harvey attempted to rebuild the line-up, Exhumed issued a double CD compilation of their early recordings titled Platters of Splatter. After touring North America, Europe, Japan, and Australia, guitarist Mike Beams departed and new guitarist Wes Caley and drummer Matt Connell made their debut. Exhumed then completed recording an album of cover songs titled Garbage Daze Re-Regurgitated. Harvey later explained that the album was intended as a "stopgap" album, although the band's subsequent hiatus put the band on hold longer than planned. Harvey later recalled:

During the hiatus, Harvey played in Dekapitator, Gravehill, and Scarecrow. Harvey, later remarking that "the passion for music didn't go away but my passion for Exhumed went away", came to regret that the band's last recording would be a covers album and, feeling rejuvenated, decided to reform Exhumed to record a new studio album.

Reunion (2010–present) 
In an interview conducted shortly after announcing that Exhumed would reform, Harvey remarked that "After a few years off and away from the death metal scene, I feel rejuvenated and ready to hack, maim, and kill once again. I wanted this to be a continuation of what the band was doing and was on its way to doing, not a reunion or some weird nostalgia thing."

In 2010, the band recorded All Guts, No Glory. The album line up was Harvey on guitars and high vocals, del Muerte on bass and low vocals, Caley on guitar, and Danny Walker on drums. The musical approach taken on All Guts, No Glory was, according to Harvey, intentionally based on the band members' favoured elements of previous Exhumed records: "We all agreed that the period of Exhumed we liked the best was Slaughtercult and wanted to mix that with the technicality and melody of Anatomy."

The band toured extensively, although del Muerte and Walker left the band to complete Murder Construct's debut album. They were replaced by Bob Babcock and Mike Hamilton (Deeds of Flesh), respectively.

In 2012, guitarist Caley was replaced by Bud Burke, and the band recorded Necrocracy, which was released by Relapse Records on August 2, 2013. Harvey described the album as being "not quite as fast" as All Guts, No Glory.

On November 6, 2014, the band appeared on the season 3 premiere of The Eric Andre Show.

In November 2014, Matt Ferri replaced Rob Babcock on bass.

In 2015, Matt Ferri left and Ross Sewage rejoined the band on bass.

The band released their seventh album Death Revenge on October 13, 2017.

Songwriting 
Over the years of their existence, Exhumed's approach to songwriting has become increasingly traditional in its structure and has been greatly influenced by Metal acts such as Visage. Main songwriter Matt Harvey said:

Lyrical themes 
Exhumed's lyrics focus on gore themes. However, the band uses this thematic lens in an allegorical fashion. Lyricist Matt Harvey said:

On Necrocracy, Harvey wrote lyrics that applied the gore theme to political subject matter, such as a critique of American corporatism and consumerism.

Personnel

Current 
 Matt Harvey – vocals, guitars (1990–2005, 2010–present)
 Ross Sewage – vocals (1994–1999, 2015–present), bass (1995–99, 2015-present)
 Mike Hamilton – drums (2011–present)
 Sebastian Philips – guitars (2018–present)

Former 
 Bud Burke – bass, vocals (1999–2003), guitars, vocals (2012–2018)
 Rocky Torrecillas – guitar (1990–1991)
 Derrel Houdashelt – guitar (1991–1996)
 Leon del Muerte – guitar, vocals (1996–1997), bass, vocals (2003–2005, 2010–2011)
 Mike Beams – guitar, vocals (1998–2004)
 Wes Caley – guitar (2004–2005, 2010–2012)
 Peter Rossman – bass (1990–1991)
 Ben Marrs – bass (1991–1992)
 Jake Giardina – vocals (1991–93), bass (1993)
 Matt Widener – bass, vocals (1994–1995)
 Rob Babcock – bass, vocals (2012–2014)
 Matt Ferri – bass, vocals (2014–2015)
 Col Jones – drums (1990–2003)
 Danny Walker – drums (2003–2004, 2010–2011)
 Matt Connell – drums (2004–2005)

Timeline

Discography

Albums 
Gore Metal (1998)
Slaughtercult (2000)
Anatomy Is Destiny (2003)
Garbage Daze Re-Regurgitated (2005)
All Guts, No Glory (2011)
Necrocracy (2013)
Death Revenge (2017)
Horror (2019)
To the Dead (2022)

EPs and splits 
 Excreting Innards (7-inch) (1992)
 Split cassette with Haemorrhage (1995)
 In the Name of Gore (split CD with Hemdale) (1996)
 Blood And Alcohol (split 7-inch with Pale Existence) (1996)
 Chords of Chaos (4-way split with Ear Bleeding Disorder, Necrose, and Excreted Alive) (1997)
 Instruments of Hell (split 7-inch with No Comply) (1997)
 Indignities to the Dead (split 7-inch with Pantalones Abajo Marinero) (1997)
 Totally Fucking Dead (split 7-inch with Nyctophobic) (1998)
 Tales of the Exhumed (split 7-inch with Retaliation) (1998)
 Split 7-inch with Sanity's Dawn (2000)
 Split 7-inch with Gadget (2001)
 Deceased in the East/Extirpated Live Emanations (live split 10-inch with Aborted) (2003)
 Something Sickened This Way Comes / To Clone and to Enforce (split 7-inch and mini-CD with Ingrowing) (2006)
 Exhumed/Iron Reagan (2014) Tankcrimes Records
 Twisted Horror (10-inch split with Gruesome) (2020) Relapse Records
 Worming (2021)

Compilations 
Platters of Splatter (double album) (2004)

References 

Deathgrind musical groups
Death metal musical groups from California
Political music groups
Relapse Records artists
Musical groups from San Jose, California
Listenable Records artists